The 2012 World Mountain Running Championships were held on 2 September in Val Camonica in the Italian Alps. The course ran from Temù - Ponte di Legno to Tonale Pass. It was the 28th edition of the championships, organised by the World Mountain Running Association (WMRA), and the seventh time that Italy had hosted the competition. The competition featured four races, with senior and junior (under-19) races for both men and women. A total of 343 runners from a record high of 40 nations finished the competition.

All the races for the 2012 edition of the championships were uphill. The men's course was 14.1 km long with an incline of 1150 m. The women's and junior men's course had a distance of 8.8 km with an ascent of 760 m. The junior women's race was 3.9 km in length with a climb of 310 m. Each of the races had an individual and team race element.

Eleven nations reached the medal table, with Turkey, Eritrea and Uganda each taking two gold medals. Turkey won the most medals overall (five) and the host nation Italy had the next most with three silvers and one bronze. Mamo Petro won the senior men's race and also headed Eritrea to the team title. The 2010 world champion Andrea Mayr took the women's senior race, which saw the United States claim the team gold. Michael Cherop of Uganda and Sevilay Eytemis of Turkey were the junior champions and also led their nations to their respective team titles.

The candidature of the region to host the event was accepted in September 2011. WMRA Council member Raimondo Balicco suggested the idea and Innocente Agostini, father of 1989 world junior champion Andrea Agostini, acted as organising director for the championships. The venue had previously hosted Italian national championships in mountain running. Franco Arese, the head of the Italian athletics federation (FIDAL), was in attendance. The competition was broadcast on television locally.

The 28th WMRA Congress was also held at the location of the championships. An open race for male and female members of the public held on the same day of the championships attracted 66 runners.

Results

Totals: 138 finishers, 21 national teams

Senior women

Totals: 88 finishers, 19 national teams

Junior men

Totals: 71 finishers, 16 national teams

Junior women

Totals: 46 finishers, 15 national teams

Medal table

Participating nations
Note: total of 43 nations includes observer nations

References

Results
In-depth results

External links
Official championships website
Official WMRA website

World Mountain Running Championships
World Mountain Running
2012 in Italian sport
International athletics competitions hosted by Italy
Province of Brescia